The 27 April 2012 Damascus bombing was a suicide attack that targeted the Syrian military, killing nine people. The event, occurred during the Syrian Civil War, was claimed by the al-Nusra Front.

See also
List of bombings during the Syrian Civil War

References

Damascus in the Syrian civil war
Suicide bombings in Syria
Military operations of the Syrian civil war involving the al-Nusra Front
Terrorist incidents in Syria in 2012
April 2012 events in Syria